Events from the year 1937 in Spain.

Incumbents
President: Manuel Azaña
Prime Minister: Francisco Largo Caballero until May 17, Juan Negrín

Events
February 6–27 - Battle of Jarama
March 5 - Battle of Cape Machichaco
March 6-April 16 - Battle of Pozoblanco
March 8–23 - Battle of Guadalajara
March 31-October 21 - War in the North
March 31-July 1 - Biscay Campaign
March 31 - Battle of Guadarrama
March 31 - Bombing of Durango
April 1 - Bombing of Jaén
April 26 - Bombing of Guernica
May 3–8 - Barcelona May Days
May 29 - Deutschland incident (1937)
May 31 - Bombardment of Almería
May 31-June 6 - Segovia Offensive
June 12–19 - Huesca Offensive
June 12–19 - Battle of Bilbao
July 5-August 11 - Battle of Albarracín
July 6–25 - Battle of Brunete
August 14-September 17 - Battle of Santander
August 24-September 7 - Zaragoza Offensive
August 24-September 7 - Battle of Belchite (1937)

Births
 February 26 – Eduardo Arroyo, Spanish painter and graphic artist (d. 2018)
 May 9 – Rafael Moneo, Spanish architect
 August 3 – Andrés Gimeno, Spanish tennis player (d. 2019)
 December 6 – Ramon Torrents, Spanish artist

Deaths
January 18 - Jaime Hilario Barbal (born 1898)
June 3 - Emilio Mola, One of the three leaders of the Spanish civil war. (born 1887)
June 20 - Andrés Nin (born 1892)
 26 July — Gerda Taro, Polish-German war photographer (born 1910)

See also
List of Spanish films of the 1930s

External links

 
1930s in Spain
Years of the 20th century in Spain